A ritual is the scripted performance of ceremonial action, usually for a perceived supernatural purpose.

Ritual(s) or The Ritual may also refer to:

Film and television 
Ritual (2000 film) or Shiki-Jitsu, a Japanese film directed by Hideaki Anno
Ritual (2002 film), a Tales from the Crypt film
Ritual (2012 film), an Indonesian horror thriller film
Ritual (2013 film), an American horror film
The Ritual (2009 film), an American horror film
The Ritual (2017 film), a British horror film
Rituals (film), a 1977 Canadian horror/thriller film directed by Peter Carter
Ritual (TV play), a 1970 Australian teleplay by Alan Hopgood
Rituals (TV series), a 1984–1985 American soap opera

Literature 
Ritual (Pinner novel), a 1967 novel by David Pinner; basis for the 1973 film The Wicker Man
Ritual, a 2008 novel by Mo Hayder
The Ritual (novel), a 2011 novel by Adam Nevill
Rituals (novel), a 1980 novel by Cees Nooteboom
Roman Ritual, a Catholic book containing liturgies for certain services
The Ritual, a fictitious act in the Artemis Fowl series

Music

Bands
Ritual (post-punk band), an English post-punk and gothic rock band 1981–1983
Ritual (electronic band), an English electronic pop band formed in 2014

Albums
Ritual (The Black Dahlia Murder album), 2011
Ritual (Fernando Otero album), 2015
Ritual (In This Moment album), 2017
Ritual (Jape album), 2008
Ritual (Keith Jarrett album) or the title song, 1982
Ritual (Los Piojos album), 1999
Ritual. (Master's Hammer album) or the title song, 1991
Ritual (Oomph! album), 2019
Ritual (Peter Frohmader album), 1986
Ritual (Shaman album) or the title song, 2002
Ritual (Soulfly album) or the title song, 2018
Ritual (White Lies album), 2011
Ritual: The Modern Jazz Messengers, by Art Blakey and the Jazz Messengers, or the title song, 1960
Ritual, by Vampires Everywhere!, 2016
Ritual, an EP by Envy on the Coast, 2017
The Ritual (Testament album) or the title song, 1992
The Ritual, by Sabac, 2008
Rituals (Fenech-Soler album) or the title songs, 2013
Rituals (John Zorn album), 2005
Rituals (Rotting Christ album), 2016

Songs
"Ritual" (Marshmello song), 2016
"Ritual" (Tiësto, Jonas Blue and Rita Ora song), 2019
"Ritual", by Annihilator from Waking the Fury, 2002
"Ritual", by Black Veil Brides from Set the World on Fire, 2011
"Ritual", by Crystal Lake from Helix, 2018
"Ritual", by Dan Reed Network, 1988
"Ritual", by Delerium from Mythologie, 2016
"Ritual", by Ghost from Opus Eponymous, 2010
"Ritual", by Gorgoroth from Pentagram, 1994
"Ritual", by Meshuggah from None, 1994
"Ritual (Nous Sommes du Soleil)", by Yes from Tales from Topographic Oceans, 1973
"The Ritual", by Heavenly from Dust to Dust, 2004
"The Ritual", by Quiet Riot from Alive and Well, 1999
"Rituals", by This Will Destroy You from Moving on the Edges of Things, 2010

Other uses 
Ritual (company), an online retailer of multivitamins and nutritional supplements for women
Ritual Entertainment, a computer game software developer

See also
Rite (disambiguation)